India currently does not have any High-speed rail lines operational, but have several lines planned and one of which is currently under construction. The following article lists all the lines in various stages of completion.

Overview

Network

Mumbai-Ahmedabad

<noinclude>

Mumbai–Ahmedabad high-speed rail corridor is the first of the twelve lines proposed and also the first one to be under-construction, it connects India's economic hub Mumbai with the city of Ahmedabad.

Delhi-Varanasi

The Delhi-Varanasi High Speed Rail Corridor is India's second bullet train project after the Mumbai-Ahmedabad Corridor. The  stretch will connect Varanasi to Delhi through 12 stations via Lucknow & Ayodhya.

Delhi-Ahmedabad

Chennai-Mysuru

Mumbai-Nagpur

Mumbai-Hyderabad

Varanasi-Howrah

Hyderabad-Bengaluru

Nagpur-Varanasi

Delhi-Amritsar

Patna-Guwahati

Amritsar-Jammu

See also
High-speed rail in India
NHSRCL
Future of rail transport in India
Urban rail transit in India

References

External links
 Preliminary Study
 India's first bullet train project launched, by Respected PM Narendra Modi calls it New India's big dream
 OpenStreetMap with route of Mumbai–Ahmedabad high-speed rail corridor；Permanent link

High-speed rail in Asia
High-speed rail in Asia by country
High-speed rail in India
High-speed railway lines in India
Standard gauge railways in India
Proposed railway lines in India
India–Japan relations
2028 in rail transport